Horst Melzig (born 2 October 1940) is a German fencer. He competed for East Germany in the individual and team épée events at the 1972 Summer Olympics.

References

1940 births
Living people
German male fencers
Olympic fencers of East Germany
Fencers at the 1972 Summer Olympics